James Cuthbertson (born 7 December 1947) is an English former professional footballer who played as an inside forward.

Career
Born in Silksworth, Cuthbertson played for Dawdon Colliery Welfare, Bradford City and Thackley. For Bradford City he made 28 appearances in the Football League, scoring 7 goals; he also made 1 appearance in the FA Cup.

Sources

References

1947 births
Living people
People from the City of Sunderland
Footballers from Tyne and Wear
English footballers
Association football inside forwards
Dawdon Colliery Welfare F.C. players
Bradford City A.F.C. players
Thackley F.C. players
English Football League players